Maguire is an Irish surname.

Maguire may also refer to:

Jerry Maguire, 1996 film starring Tom Cruise
Maguire Seven, Irish family accused in the 1970s for bomb-making; later exonerated
Maguire University, fictitious college invented in 1963 by a group of Chicago high school basketball coaches
Molly Maguires, Irish secret society; established 1843; later transplanted to the USA
Sam Maguire Cup, award for the winning Gaelic football team
The Molly Maguires, 1970 film about the Irish secret society
Withers-Maguire House, historic house in Ocoee, Florida, USA
Harry Maguire, English professional footballer

See also
McGuire (disambiguation)